Allan Woodrow may refer to:

 Allan Lee Woodrow (1886–1966), Canadian Senator
 Allan Woodrow (author) (born 1964), American author of children's literature

See also 
 Alan Woodrow (born 1952), Canadian opera singer